The Hotel Burchianti is a boutique hotel with 11 rooms located in Florence Italy near the Santa Maria Novella.

According to the hotel's website, the hotel used to be a palace belonging to the noble family of Castiglioni.

The place was then turned into a hotel and opened in 1919 or 1936 by the Burchianti sisters.

The hotel is allegedly haunted, Reuters listed it under top ten haunted hotels.

References

Hotels in Florence